Atyuryevo (Ateŕ) is a rural locality (a selo) and the administrative center of Atyuryevsky District of the Republic of Mordovia, Russia. Population:

References

Notes

Sources

Rural localities in Mordovia
Atyuryevsky District
Temnikovsky Uyezd